Tilman is both a masculine given name and a surname. The German version of the surname is Tillmann. Other variants include Tillman and Dillman.

Notable people with the name include:

People with the given name 
 Tilman Fertitta (1957), American businessman
 Tilman Goins, Tennessee State Lower House Chamber Member from Hamblen County
 Tilman Bacon Parks (1872–1950), U.S. Representative from Arkansas
 Tilman Pesch (1836–1899), German Jesuit philosopher
 Tilman Riemenschneider (1460–1531), German sculptor and woodcarver
 Tilman Valentin "Til" Schweiger (born 1963), German actor, director, and producer
 Saint Tilman (c. 608–702), French priest, abbot and hermit

People with the surname 
 Bill Tilman (1898–1977), English mountaineer and explorer
 G. David Tilman (born 1949), American ecologist
 Felicia Tilman, fictional character in the television series Desperate Housewives
 Manuel Tilman, East Timorese politician
 Pat Tillman (1976–2004), American football player and soldier in the United States Army

See also 
 
 
 Tillman, surname and given name
 Tilmann, given name

References 

German masculine given names